The Aynesworth–Wright House is a historic Austin, Texas, house, built in 1852 and listed on the National Register of Historic Places. It is now located at Pioneer Farms, 10621 Pioneer Farms Drive.

Description and history 
The Texas Historical Commission plaque reads: Isaiah Hezekiah Aynesworth (b. 1797) a Baptist preacher and cabinet maker, constructed this Greek revival residence about 1852. Originally located at 4507 East Avenue, it was a two-room house with an enclosed dog-run hallway. Additional rooms were later attached to the back porch. Dr. Joseph Wright (1798-1898) purchased the property from Aynesworth in 1855. A physician and surveyor, Wright practiced medicine in a log building near his home. The house was moved to this location and restored by Franklin Savings Association.

References

Houses completed in 1852
Greek Revival houses in Texas
Houses on the National Register of Historic Places in Texas
Houses in Austin, Texas
National Register of Historic Places in Austin, Texas
1852 establishments in Texas